Koš is a village and municipality in Prievidza District in the Trenčín Region of western Slovakia.

Etymology
Slovak kôš, koš - a basket, but also a knitted fence. Kos (1408).

History
In historical records the village was first mentioned in 1367.

Geography
The municipality lies at an altitude of 270 metres and covers an area of 13.586 km². It has a population of about 900 people.

Genealogical resources

The records for genealogical research are available at the state archive "Statny Archiv in Nitra, Slovakia"

 Roman Catholic church records (births/marriages/deaths): 1691-1906 (parish A)

See also
 List of municipalities and towns in Slovakia

References

External links
 
 
https://web.archive.org/web/20090412234949/http://www.statistics.sk/mosmis/eng/run.html
Surnames of living people in Kos

Villages and municipalities in Prievidza District